Alexander Martín Callens Asín (born 4 May 1992) is a Peruvian professional footballer who plays as a central defender for La Liga side Girona and the Peru national team.

Club career

Sport Boys
Born in Callao, Callens played youth football with Sport Boys. He made his professional debut on 18 April 2010 in a 3–1 loss at León de Huánuco in the Peruvian Primera División, and scored his first goal on 19 June in another away defeat, 2–1 against Inti Gas Deportes.

Spain
Callens signed a two-year contract with Real Sociedad from Spain in August 2011, being assigned to the reserves. He went on to spend several Segunda División B seasons with the latter.

On 4 December 2014, Callens made his debut with the first team, featuring the entire second half of the 0–0 draw at Real Oviedo in the round of 32 of the Copa del Rey. On 6 June 2015, he was released.

On 10 August 2015, Callens joined Segunda División side CD Numancia on a one-year deal. He scored his first goal in the league the following 16 January, in a 2–0 away win over Albacete Balompié.

New York City
On 23 January 2017, Callens terminated his contract and joined New York City FC shortly after. He scored his first goal in the Major League Soccer on 3 June, helping the hosts to beat Philadelphia Union 2–1.

Callens converted his attempt in the penalty shootout victory against the Portland Timbers in the MLS Cup 2021 on 11 December, closing the 4–2 score at Providence Park. On 14 September 2022, he scored from open play to open an eventual 2–0 victory over Atlas F.C. in the Campeones Cup.

International career
Callens won his first cap for Peru on 17 April 2013, coming on as a 74th-minute substitute for Orlando Contreras in a 0–0 friendly draw with Mexico held in San Francisco. He scored his first goal for his country on 9 September 2014 in another exhibition game, opening the 2–0 win over Qatar.

Callens was part of the squads at the 2019 and 2021 Copa América tournaments, making five appearances in the latter for the fourth-placed team.

Personal life
In June 2018, Callens earned a U.S. green card which qualified him as a domestic player for MLS roster purposes.

Career statistics

Club

International

Scores and results list Peru's goal tally first, score column indicates score after each Callens goal.

Honours
New York City FC
MLS Cup: 2021
Campeones Cup: 2022

References

External links

Profile at the Girona FC website

1992 births
Living people
Sportspeople from Callao
Peruvian footballers
Association football defenders
Peruvian Primera División players
Sport Boys footballers
Segunda División players
Segunda División B players
Real Sociedad B footballers
Real Sociedad footballers
CD Numancia players
Major League Soccer players
New York City FC players
Girona FC players
Peru international footballers
2019 Copa América players
2021 Copa América players
Peruvian expatriate footballers
Expatriate footballers in Spain
Expatriate soccer players in the United States
Peruvian expatriate sportspeople in Spain
Peruvian expatriate sportspeople in the United States